Elisenheim is a residential area north of Windhoek, the capital of Namibia. It was declared a township in December 2011 when the first building plans for houses were submitted to the City of Windhoek, and infrastructure such as roads, sewerage, and electricity installations has been put in place.

The development of Elisenheim was estimated to cost more than a billion N$ in total, making it the largest residential project in Namibia.

References 

Suburbs of Windhoek